Huisnes-sur-Mer (literally Huisnes on Sea) is a commune in the Manche department in north-western France.

See also 
Communes of the Manche department

References

Communes of Manche
Populated coastal places in France